The Sassi–Superga tramway is a steep grade railway line in the city of Turin in northern Italy. From here, high in the hills facing the city across the River Po, a panorama of Turin is visible against a backdrop of the Alps. Intermediate stops (only on demand) are located at Prima Galleria, Raddoppio, and Pian Gambino.

The line was opened on 27 April 1884 as a cable driven rack railway of the Agudio system. In this system cables ran along the side of the track and passed around two large pulleys on each side of the cars, which in turn drove the cog wheels that propelled the train consisting of the driven car (only occupied by the driver and a brakeman) and up to three passenger cars. The cable was originalle driven by a steam engine in the upper station, from 1922 on by an electric motor. During World War I passenger numbers dropped sharply, so that the line was temporarily shut down until 1919.

After an accident, in which one of the cables broke, but the emergency brake prevented further damage, the line was converted to a conventional electric rack railway using the Strub rack system. Work started on 24 October 1934, the line re-opened on 16 April 1935. Guides for the previous cables can still be found along the line. New motor cars were built by Officine Meccaniche della Stanga. Some of the old passenger cars remained in use, others were sold.

The line is electrified with a third rail at 600 volts. A passing loop is located at Radoppio halt. Trains reach the summit in approximately eighteen minutes. Although it does not run in the street, the line and its cars have some of the characteristics of a tramway, and the line is often referred to as such. It is integrated into the public transport network of Turin as line No. 79.

Three pure-rack motor cars are used. Each of them can move up to two unpowered cars. Every such trains can carry up to 220 passengers. The depot has no rack, nor third electrified rail, so that the rack engines and carriages are shunted by a small electric locomotive fed by overhead wires. The track connection to Turin's urban tramway network is used to transfer rolling stock to and from the workshop.

Gallery

External links 

Superga Rack Railway web page  
Timetable

Bibliography 
  Proposal with notes

References 

Mountain railways
Transport in Turin
Rack railways in Italy
Tram transport in Italy
Railway lines in Piedmont
1445 mm gauge railways
600 V DC railway electrification
1884 establishments in Italy
Superga